The vocal fry register (also known as pulse register, laryngealization, pulse phonation, creaky voice, creak, croak, popcorning, glottal fry, glottal rattle, glottal scrape) is the lowest vocal register and is produced through a loose glottal closure that permits air to bubble through slowly with a popping or rattling sound of a very low frequency. During this phonation, the arytenoid cartilages in the larynx are drawn together, which causes the vocal folds to compress rather tightly and become relatively slack and compact. This process forms a large and irregularly vibrating mass within the vocal folds that produces the characteristic low popping or rattling sound when air passes through the glottal closure. The register (if well controlled) can extend far below the modal voice register, in some cases up to 8 octaves lower, such as in the case of Tim Storms who holds the world record for lowest frequency note ever produced by a human, a G−7, which is only 0.189 Hz, inaudible to the human ear.

Vocal fry is thought to have become more common among young female speakers of American English in the early 21st century, with the style of speaking being considered informal, nonaggressive and urban-oriented.

History of register classification 

The vocal fry register has been a recognized and identifiable register in American English only within the past few decades, but its characteristic sound was recognized much earlier. Discussion of the vocal fry or pulse register began first within the field of phonetics and speech therapy and did not enter the vocabulary of vocal music pedagogists until the early 1970s, when it was initially controversial. However, the controversy surrounding the term within vocal music has subsided as more research into the use of the vocal fry register within the context of singing ensued. In particular, vocal pedagogist Margaret Greene's videotaping of the physiological processes occurring in the body while singers were phonating in the vocal fry register offered solid evidence that this type of vocal phonation should be considered a vocal register from both speech pathology and vocal music perspectives. Like any other vocal register, the vocal fry register has a unique vibratory pattern of the vocal folds, a certain series of pitches, and a certain type of sound that distinguishes it from other vocal registers.

In speech 

Discussion of vocal fry is much more frequent in books related to phonetics and speech therapy than it is in those dealing with singing. Some authorities consider the use of vocal fry in speech a dysphonia, but others consider it so only if it is used excessively such as Hollien, Moore, Wendahl, and Michel:

It is simply our intent to suggest that ordinarily vocal fry constitutes one of several physiologically available types of voice production on the frequency-pitch continuum and hence, of itself, is not logically classified among the laryngeal pathologies. While the excessive use of fry could result in a diagnosis of voice disorder, this quality is too often heard in normal voices (especially in descending inflections where the voice fundamentally falls below frequencies in the modal register) to be exclusively a disorder.

Many are quick to point out that although vocal fry is minimally a part of routine speaking patterns, the continued use of such a pattern makes it non-utilitarian or pathological.

Some evidence exists of vocal fry becoming more common in the speech of young female speakers of American English in the early 21st century, but its frequency's extent and significance are disputed. Researcher Ikuko Patricia Yuasa suggests that the tendency is a product of young women trying to infuse their speech with gravitas by means of reaching for the male register and found that "college-age Americans ... perceive female creaky voice as hesitant, nonaggressive, and informal but also educated, urban-oriented, and upwardly mobile."

A 2014 national study of American adults found that speech with vocal fry was perceived more negatively than a voice without vocal fry, particularly in a labor market context. In young adult women, it was perceived as sounding less trustworthy, less competent, less attractive, and less hireable. The negative evaluation was stronger when the evaluator was also a woman.

The national study of 800 listeners across age groups found that people making hiring decisions preferred a voice without vocal fry to one with vocal fry. A limitation of the study was that the vocal fry samples were produced by imitators rather than natural vocal fry speakers. That suggests that more research is needed, as the negative reaction could be attributable to other factors.

In native speakers of American English, young women use vocal fry more frequently than men. When asked to read a passage, female speakers used vocal fry at a rate four times higher than male speakers.

Some languages, such as Jalapa Mazatec, use vocal fry (creaky voice) as a linguistically significant marker; the presence or absence of vocal fry can then change the meaning of a word.

Social implications 

Some people seek out the help of speech pathologists as they feel vocal fry makes them appear unsure and less confident. Researchers have found that young adult women who use vocal fry are perceived as less competent and less hireable (listeners have less of a negative reaction to male voices). Others argue that these perceptions are part of a broader attack on women's speech.

Vocal fry is generally seen as a negative characteristic in the workplace, but a study by Duke University researchers has determined the phenomenon is becoming more common and socially acceptable.

In singing 
The croaking sound produced by male singers at the start of phrases in American country music is produced by moving from this to the modal register. Within choral music, when true basses are not available, choirs often rely on singers who can "fry" the low bass notes. Singers such as Tim Storms, Mike Holcomb and various other gospel basses use this technique to sing very low tones.  Some styles of folk singing showcase the vocal fry register in the female voice. Vocal fry is also used in metal music, usually in combination with air from the diaphragm, in order to create a "growl" or "scream," which sounds aggressive and harsh.

The chief use of the vocal fry register in singing is to obtain pitches of very low frequency, which are not available to the singer in the modal register. The physiological production of the vocal fry register may be extended up into the modal register. In some cases, vocal pedagogues have found the use of vocal fry therapeutically helpful to students who have trouble producing lower notes. Singers often lose their low notes or never learn to produce them because of the excessive tension of the laryngeal muscles and of the support mechanism that leads to too much breath pressure.

Some throat singing styles such as kargyra use vocal techniques similar to vocal fry.

See also 

 Basso profondo
 Breathy voice
 Creaky voice
 Death growl
 Throat singing
 Glottal stop
 Harsh voice
 High rising terminal
 Overtone singing
 Sexy baby voice
 Slack voice
 Valleyspeak
 Vocal register

Notes

References 

 
 
 
 
 

Phonation
Voice registers